James Ransford (1884–1929) was an English footballer who played in the Football League for Derby County.

References

1884 births
1929 deaths
English footballers
Association football forwards
English Football League players
Alfreton Town F.C. players
Derby County F.C. players